Cloud Stairs is a 2006 South Korean television series starring Shin Dong-wook, Han Ji-hye, Im Jung-eun and Kim Jung-hyun. It aired on KBS2 from September 18 to November 7, 2006 on Mondays and Tuesdays at 21:55 for 16 episodes.

Plot
Jong-soo has no other choice but to give up going to medical school due to financial difficulties. He leaves for a remote island without telling anyone his whereabouts. On the island, he meets a doctor who teaches him medical techniques and begins to treat patients without a license. One day Jong-soo rescues Jung-won, a dying woman by mere chance, and is mistaken for a talented doctor. But things get messed up as he continues to meet with Jung-won, as one misunderstanding spawns another. He ends up falling in love with her, and gradually finds himself addicted to love. To protect his feelings, Jong-soo keeps lying about his educational background and tries to escape from his past. But when he reaches the pinnacle of his "success," he realizes that everything he has done so far was in vain. His love turns into poison and ruins his life.

Cast

Main characters
Shin Dong-wook as Choi Jong-soo
Han Ji-hye as Yoon Jung-won
Im Jung-eun as Oh Yoon-hee
Kim Jung-hyun as Kim Do-hyun

Supporting characters
Choi Jong-won as Doctor Byun 
Kim Yong-gun as Doctor Yoon, Jung-won's father
Yang Geum-seok as Jung-won's mother 
Lee Mi-young as Yoon-hee's mother 
Yeon Kyu-jin as Director Kim, Do-hyun's father
Kang Joo-hyung
Jang Ji-min
Kim Sang-won

References

External links
Cloud Stairs official KBS website 

Korean Broadcasting System television dramas
Korean-language television shows
2006 South Korean television series debuts
2006 South Korean television series endings
South Korean romance television series
Television shows based on Japanese novels
Television series by JS Pictures